At the 1984 Winter Olympics, eleven  Nordic skiing events were contested – eight cross-country skiing events, two ski jumping events, and one Nordic combined event.

1984 Winter Olympics events
1984